Agia Sotira is a village in the municipal unit of Pentalofos, Kozani regional unit, Greece.
From Agia Sotira has heritage the professional basketball player Zach Auguste.

References

External links
 Birds of Agia Sotira
 Agia Sotira church

Populated places in Kozani (regional unit)